Printer's Devil is the third studio album from American indie rock band Ratboys, released on February 28, 2020.

Track listing

References

2020 albums
Ratboys albums
Topshelf Records albums